Stahlkammer Zürich is a German television series.

Polish composer Joanna Bruzdowicz together with her husband, Horst-Jürgen Tittel, former top advisor to the president of the European Commission. Together, they created the soundtrack for this 36-episode series. Bruzdowicz wrote over 15 hours of music for this series.

See also
List of German television series

External links
 

1987 German television series debuts
2001 German television series endings
German crime television series
Television shows set in Switzerland
German-language television shows
Das Erste original programming